Dušan Joković (born 4 July 1999) is a Serbian footballer who plays for Proleter Novi Sad.

Career

In 2018, Joković signed for Austrian top flight side LASK from FK Brodarac in the Serbian third division, before being sent on loan to Croatian second division club Sesvete.

In 2019, he signed for Lokomotiva in the Croatian top flight.

For the second half of 2019/20, he signed for Serbian top flight team Proleter Novi Sad.

References

External links
 

1999 births
Sportspeople from Kraljevo
Living people
Serbian footballers
Association football defenders
Serbia under-21 international footballers
NK Sesvete players
FK Proleter Novi Sad players
First Football League (Croatia) players
Serbian SuperLiga players
Serbian expatriate footballers
Expatriate footballers in Croatia
Serbian expatriate sportspeople in Croatia